Aleks Romanovich Matsukatov (born 11 January 1999) is a Russian football player who plays for Akron Tolyatti on loan from FC Krasnodar.

Club career
He made his debut in the Russian Professional Football League for FC Krasnodar-2 on 29 July 2016 in a game against FC Sochi. He made his Russian Football National League debut for Krasnodar-2 on 17 July 2018 in a game against FC Sibir Novosibirsk.

He made his Russian Premier League debut for FC Krasnodar on 19 July 2020 in a game against FC Dynamo Moscow, substituting Daniil Utkin in the 76th minute.

On 22 February 2023, Matsukatov joined Akron Tolyatti on loan with an option to buy.

Career statistics

References

External links
 
 
 

1999 births
Sportspeople from North Ossetia–Alania
People from Prigorodny District, North Ossetia–Alania
Living people
Russian footballers
Association football midfielders
Russia youth international footballers
Russia under-21 international footballers
FC Krasnodar-2 players
FC Krasnodar players
FC Akron Tolyatti players
Russian Premier League players
Russian First League players
Russian Second League players